Daniel Sylvanus Mensah Torto (born 1960) is a Ghanaian Anglican bishop. He has been the Anglican Bishop of Accra, in the Church of the Province of West Africa, since 2012.

Education
Torto was educated at St. Thomas Aquinas Senior High School, the University of Ghana, Episcopal Divinity School and Vision International University.

Ministry
His ministry has seen him serve at Mamprobi, Accra, Osu and Adabraka.

Senior posts
Immediately before becoming bishop, he was chairman of the Accra East Archdeaconry and General Secretary of the Ghana Anglican Clergy Association.

Personal life
He is married to Gladys and they have four children.

References

External links
Bio page from the Anglican Communion

1960 births
University of Ghana alumni
Living people
21st-century Anglican bishops in Ghana
Anglican bishops of Accra
People educated at St. Thomas Aquinas Senior High School